is a railway station in the city of  Toyohashi, Aichi Prefecture, Japan, operated by the Public–private partnership Toyohashi Railroad.

Lines
Takashi Station is a station of the Atsumi Line, and is located 4.3 kilometers from the starting point of the line at Shin-Toyohashi Station.

Station layout
The station has one island platform connected to the station building by a level crossing. The station is unattended.

Adjacent stations

Station history
Takashi Station was established on January 22, 1924 as a station on the privately held Atsumi Railroad. On September 1, 1940, the Atsumi Railway became part of the Nagoya Railway system, but was spun out into the Toyohashi Railway on October 1, 1954. The station building was rebuilt in June 1970.

Passenger statistics
In fiscal 2017, the station was used by an average of 2869 passengers daily.

Surrounding area
Japan National Route 259

See also
 List of railway stations in Japan

References

External links

Toyohashi Railway Official home page

Railway stations in Aichi Prefecture
Railway stations in Japan opened in 1924
Toyohashi